The Alamo Quarry Market is a lifestyle center located in the Lincoln Heights neighborhood of north central San Antonio in the U.S. state of Texas, near the cities of Alamo Heights and Terrell Hills. It once functioned as a cement plant until it was abandoned. Since then it has been redeveloped into a thriving market with a Regal Cinema theater dominating the oldest building and is surrounded by other businesses including bookstores and many restaurants.

The Quarry still maintains the facade of the cement factory and its most notable feature and landmark is the four historical smokestacks that can be seen several miles from the Quarry. In 1998, Tramell Crow brought in structural restoration and preservation specialist Delta Structural Technology, Inc. to restore and preserve three of the four stacks. These smokestacks had previously been retrofitted with steel bands every  from top to bottom, which had either rusted and fallen off or had relaxed providing little, if any structural confinement. The structural contractor utilized an exclusive retrofit technique which involved complete encapsulation of three of the four stacks using high performance structural composites saturated in an epoxy matrix. The installation took less than two months, and received multiple awards within the historical preservation and concrete construction industry.

Another popular feature of the Quarry is the many life-sized, brightly colored cow statues from the Cow Parade that are scattered throughout the market place.

Stores at Alamo Quarry Market include Ann Taylor and Ann Taylor Loft, Old Navy, a two-story Nordstrom Rack, Whole Foods Market, Michael's, Pottery Barn, Office Max, Restoration Hardware, Whole Earth Provision Co., and many more. Restaurants include California Pizza Kitchen, Starbucks, P.F. Chang's China Bistro, Joe's Crab Shack, Chili's, Piatti, ZEDRIC'S, Orange Cup, Freddie's, and J. Alexander's.

The Quarry Village, a mixed-used development, is located across from the Alamo Quarry Market, and is much more dense and urban in design when compared to the Market. Its tenants include Starbucks, Jamba Juice, Trader Joe's, Five Guys and more.

Anchors
Quarry Cinema
Nordstrom Rack
Gold's Gym
Charming Charlie

Former Anchors
Borders - a bookstore, opened 1998, closed 2011, and now Nordstrom Rack.
Bally Total Fitness - a fitness center, opened 1998, closed 2013, and now Gold's Gym.
GameWorks - a video arcade and restaurant, opened 1998, closed 2009, and now Charming Charlie.

In Popular Culture
The Quarry Stacks are shown in the Cover of Texas Tornados album Los Texas Tornados which was released 1 August 1990

External links

Shopping malls in San Antonio
Shopping malls established in 1998
1998 establishments in Texas